Diphosphorus tetrafluoride is a gaseous compound of phosphorus and fluorine with formula P2F4. Two fluorine atoms are connected to each phosphorus atom, and there is a bond between the two phosphorus atoms. Phosphorus can be considered to have oxidation state +2, as indicated by the name phosphorus difluoride.

Production
Diphosphorus tetrafluoride was discovered in 1966 by Max Lustig, John K. Ruff and Charles B. Colburn at the Redstone Research Laboratories.  The initial synthesis reacted phosphorus iododifluoride with mercury at room temperature.

2PF2I +2Hg → P2F4 + Hg2I2

Properties
The P-P bond in diphosphorus tetrafluoride is much stronger than the corresponding N-N bond in dinitrogen tetrafluoride which easily breaks into nitrogen difluoride.

The infrared spectrum has absorption at 842 cm−1, 830 cm−1, 820 cm−1, and weaker at 408 cm−1 and 356 cm−1.

The molecule has C2h symmetry.

Reactions
Under ultraviolet light diphosphorus tetrafluoride reacts with alkynes connected to trifluoromethyl groups to add difluorophosphino (-PF2) groups on each side of a double bond. Other kinds of alkynes produced polymers with this treatment. With alkenes, similarly bis(difluorophosphino) is added across the double bond.

Diphosphorus tetrafluoride reacts with diborane to yield another gas P2F4•BH3 which does not condense above −85°C. This decomposes to yet another gas PF3•BH3 and a polymer with formula PF.

Diphosphorus tetrafluoride reacts with oxygen or water to yield diphosphorus tetrafluoride oxide, which has one oxygen atom inserted between the two phosphorus atoms:
2P2F4{} + H2O \to 2PHF2{} + F2POPF2  The latter compound is a gas with boiling point around −18°C.

References

Phosphorus fluorides
Phosphorus(II) compounds